The Bishop of Argyll and The Isles is the Ordinary of the Scottish Episcopal Diocese of Argyll and the Isles.

The Episcopal see was created by the union of the ancient bishoprics of Argyll and The Isles in 1847. The bishop has two seats: the Cathedral Church of St John the Divine in Oban and the Cathedral of The Isles and Collegiate Church of the Holy Spirit in Millport, Isle of Cumbrae, which is the smallest cathedral in the British Isles. There are two island retreat centres: Bishop's House is on Iona, while the College of the Holy Spirit is also in Millport.

Keith Riglin, Vice-Dean and a Chaplain of King's College London was elected at an Electoral Synod on 30 January 2021; his consecration took place on 1 May.

List of the Scottish Episcopal Bishops of Argyll and The Isles

References

 Argyll
Religion in Argyll and Bute